The House for an Art Lover is an arts and cultural centre in Glasgow, Scotland. The building was constructed between 1989 and 1996 based on a 1901 Art Nouveau house design by Charles Rennie Mackintosh and his wife, Margaret MacDonald. The house is situated in Glasgow's Bellahouston Park and sits east of the site of the Festival Tower of the Empire Exhibition, Scotland of 1938.

The idea to actually build the house from the Mackintoshs' designs came from Graham Roxburgh, a civil engineer in Glasgow who had done refurbishment work on the Mackintosh interiors in Craigie Hall. The house is a prominent example of the Modern Style. It serves as a venue for art exhibitions and other events, as well as being itself a visitor attraction.

History
The house was originally designed for a competition for an architectural design for a "Haus eines Kunstfreundes" (Art Lover's House), set by the German design magazine Zeitschrift für Innendekoration. Despite disqualification due to late entry and unfinished sketches, the portfolio was awarded a prize for its "pronounced personal quality, novel and austere form and the uniform configuration of interior and exterior".

Construction began in 1989 and the house was finally opened to the public in 1996. When a recession occurred in the early 1990s, construction had to stop. In 1994, the Glasgow City Council and the Glasgow School of Art (GSA) revived the project so that the interior rooms and landscape could be completed.  Mackintosh's original designs were interpreted and realised by John Kane and Graeme Robertson (up to 1990) under Andy MacMillan, with contributions by many contemporary artists. Original portfolio designs are displayed in each room to allow comparisons.

The House for an Art Lover is owned by a charitable company of the same name "whose primary purpose is the stimulation of public interest in Art, Design & Architecture. Its remit includes the development of visual art exhibitions by some of Scotland's leading artists and designers in the Cafe Gallery with a related gallery education programme for children and adults." The house also includes shops and a cafe, and functions as a venue for conferences and other types of event.

Design and construction

As with all of Mackintosh's works, the House is designed to be viewed as a whole. His work incorporated multiple styles and is a compilation of opposites. Inside the house traditional Victorian designs are juxtaposed with modern concepts, and displays the blending of masculine and feminine, natural forms with abstract thought, or simple concepts with complex designs. Mackintosh emphasized a need for architects and designers to be given greater freedom when expressing their ideas; and, this ability to create an independent design is visible in the structure and layout of the House for an Art Lover.

While the House certainly does reflect the Mackintosh style, the building is a construction based on drafts produced in 1901. It is not uncommon for architects and designers to be revising and redesigning their work until the last minute. When Mackintosh worked on the GSA, the construction was divided into two parts. From 1897 to 1899, the funding was available to complete the central and eastern sections of the building. It was not until 1907 that there was funding to complete the western wing. During the period of waiting, Mackintosh continually revised his designs for the building. As a result, the western wing is distinctly different from those completed in 1899, having a decidedly 20th-century appearance. Given his history of altering his designs during construction, it is entirely possible that Mackintosh would have made numerous changes to his drafts during the construction of the House for an Art Lover. It is for this reason that buildings constructed posthumously are often a point of contention. Many feel that there is not enough information in the designs to construct a building that reflects the architect's intent.

With this under consideration, the current House must be viewed as an interpretation of the Mackintoshes’ original designs. The Mackintoshes were designing a residential house. The current House was constructed with commercial purposes in mind. The House was built to highlight the Bellahouston Art Park, and it is currently used to house banquets, hold conferences, and exhibit artwork. Inside there is a cafe and gift shop. Clearly with the change of intent came a change of structure. Mackintosh would not have been designing for the inclusion of a cafe and gallery, so the appearance would have been different. The House is still authentic in that the original designs were used, but many in the arts community want it made clear that the house itself is not an original Mackintosh.

Gallery

Notes

References
Benitez, T 2005. 'Tradition Gets an Update.' "Successful Meetings" 54, 6, pp. 60–70, Business Source Premier, EBSCOhost.
Charles Rennie Mackintosh Society. Charles Rennie mackintosh. in CRM Society [database online]. Glasgow, Scotland, 2013,  Available online (accessed 2 August 2013)
House for an Art Lover. History of the house. in House for an Art Lover [database online]. Glasgow, Scotland, 2013. Available from "History of the House"  (accessed 2 August 2013)
'Kahn's vision of freedom lives on' 2012, "Building Design", 2032, p. 2, Business Source Premier, EBSCOhost.
Levine, Neil. 2008. Building the unbuilt: Authenticity and the archive. "Journal of the Society of Architectural Historians" 67, (1) 14-17. 
McKean, John; Colin Baxter (1998). Charles Rennie Mackintosh Pocket Guide. Grantown-on-Spey: Colin Baxter Photography Ltd.. .

External links

House for an Art Lover Official Site
House for an Art Lover - Illustrated Guide Features internal and external views.
House for an Art Lover short documentary film

Charles Rennie Mackintosh buildings
Houses in Glasgow
Historic house museums in Glasgow
Houses completed in 1996
1996 establishments in Scotland
Art Nouveau architecture in Glasgow
Art Nouveau houses